Switzerland–Yugoslavia relations were historical foreign relations between Switzerland and now broken up Yugoslavia (Kingdom of Yugoslavia 1918–1941 and Socialist Federal Republic of Yugoslavia 1945–1992). Switzerland established diplomatic relations with the Yugoslavia in 1919. A Swiss legation was established in Belgrade in 1940, which was upgraded to an embassy in 1957.

Economic cooperation
Between 1928 and early 1960's trade between the two countries represented a typical example of trade between developed (Switzerland) and developing (Yugoslavia) country in which Yugoslavia exported its natural resources and imported industrial products and equipments. In 1972 Yugoslavia was Switzerland's 24th import and 18th export partner while Switzerland was Yugoslavia's 9th import and 14th export partner. In 1960 71% of Yugoslav export to Switzerland was natural resources while in 1970 it constituted 51% and in 1975 they dropped to 37% of the total export.

References

See also 
 Foreign relations of Switzerland
 Foreign relations of Yugoslavia
 Immigration from the former Yugoslavia to Switzerland

Switzerland
Yugoslavia
Croatia–Switzerland relations
Serbia–Switzerland relations
Bosnia and Herzegovina–Switzerland relations
Montenegro–Switzerland relations
North Macedonia–Switzerland relations
Slovenia–Switzerland relations
Kosovo–Switzerland relations